The men's doubles wheelchair tennis competition at the 2008 Summer Paralympics in Beijing was held from 10 September to 15 September at the Olympic Green Tennis Centre. The DecoTurf surface rendered the event a hardcourt competition.

Medalists

Calendar

Seeds

Draw

Key

 INV = bipartite invitation
 IP = ITF place
 ALT = alternate

 r = retired
 w/o = walkover

Finals

Top half

Bottom half

References 
 
 

Men's doubles